The 2020–21 Penn State Nittany Lions men's ice hockey season was the 15th season of play for the program and the 8th season in the Big Ten Conference. The Nittany Lions represented Pennsylvania State University and were coached by Guy Gadowsky, in his 10th season.

Season
As a result of the ongoing COVID-19 pandemic the entire college ice hockey season was delayed. Because the NCAA had previously announced that all winter sports athletes would retain whatever eligibility they possessed through at least the following year, none of Penn State's players would lose a season of play. However, the NCAA also approved a change in its transfer regulations that would allow players to transfer and play immediately rather than having to sit out a season, as the rules previously required.

Penn State had a dreadful start to their season, losing their first five games while facing a murderers row of ranked teams. The team rebounded sharply in their sixth contest, scoring 9 goals and nearly doubling their season total to that point. After the Nittany Lions' first win of the year, the team played much better and slowly climbed back to respectability, winning nine of twelve and pulled themselves above .500 near the end of January. Just when it seemed like the team had turned a corner, their season was derailed by COVID-19. All of PSU's games were cancelled in February and the team didn't play again until the end of the regular season. The 34-day layoff hamstrung the team and it showed in their poor performance; despite outshooting Notre Dame in both games, the Nittany Lions lost both by a combined score of 3–12.

By losing an entire months-worth of games, Penn State couldn't overcome their bad start and the team's only path into the NCAA Tournament was by winning the Big Ten. They faced the same Fighting Irish team that had soundly beaten them a week earlier in the first round, but the game time appeared to have knocked the rust off of the Penn State and the Lions scored 5 consecutive goals to give themselves a solid 6–3 win. Their next game was against league-leading Wisconsin and Penn State showed no fear, overcoming an early deficit and outshooting the Badgers to take two separate leads in the game. Once the game got into overtime, the fast pace of regulation seemed to have caught up with PSU and they were overwhelmed by the Badgers, surrendering 10 shots in under 7 minutes and they could only watch as the nation's leading goal-scorer ended their season.

Departures

Recruiting

Roster
As of January 3, 2021.

Standings

Schedule and Results

|-
!colspan=12 style=";" | Regular Season

|-
!colspan=12 style=";" |

Scoring statistics

Goaltending statistics

Rankings

USCHO did not release a poll in week 20.

Players drafted into the NHL

2021 NHL Entry Draft

† incoming freshman

References

External links

Penn State Nittany Lions men's ice hockey seasons
Penn State Nittany Lions
Penn State Nittany Lions
Penn State Nittany Lions
2021 in sports in Pennsylvania
2020 in sports in Pennsylvania